Milton Stover Eisenhower (September 15, 1899 – May 2, 1985) was an American academic administrator. He served as president of three major American universities: Kansas State University, Pennsylvania State University, and Johns Hopkins University. He was the younger brother of U.S. President Dwight D. Eisenhower.

Early life and education
He was born in Abilene, Kansas, to Ida Elizabeth Stover (1862–1946) and David Jacob Eisenhower (1863–1942); the family was poor. Eisenhower attended public schools and graduated from Kansas State University in 1923 with a Bachelor of Science degree in industrial journalism.

Career

U.S. Department of Agriculture
Eisenhower served as Director of Information for the U.S. Department of Agriculture from 1928 to 1941, where he was a spokesman for the New Deal. He also was a key member of the Department of Agriculture's Employee Organization, the Organization of Professional Employees of the United States Department of Agriculture (OPEDA).

World War II
Early in 1942, he was appointed director of the War Relocation Authority, the U.S. government agency responsible for the relocation and internment of Japanese Americans during World War II. Eisenhower was opposed to the mass incarceration, and at initial meetings with pro-exclusion officials he suggested allowing women and children to remain on the West Coast, but the proposal was rejected. In his position as WRA director, he attempted to mitigate the consequences of the "evacuation," establishing a Japanese American advisory council with Mike Masaoka, a work program that allowed some Japanese Americans to leave camp for employment on labor-starved farms, and a student leave program that allowed Nisei who had been enrolled in college to continue their education. He also tried to get the Federal Reserve Bank to protect the property that Japanese Americans were forced to leave behind, and to convince governors of states outside the exclusion zone to allow Japanese Americans to resettle there, but these efforts were largely unsuccessful. In the 1943 government propaganda film, Japanese Relocation he said, "This picture tells how the mass migration was accomplished. Neither the Army, nor the War Relocation Authority relish the idea of taking men, women and children from their homes, their shops and their farms. So, the military and civilian agencies alike determined to do the job as a democracy should – with real consideration for the people involved." Eisenhower resigned after only ninety days, and from June 1942 to mid-1943 he was associate director of the Office of War Information.

College administrator
In May 1943, Eisenhower became President of Kansas State University (his alma mater), a position he held until 1950. During this time, he also served as the first Chairman of the U.S. National Commission for UNESCO. In this role, Eisenhower sought to also establish a UNESCO commissions for each state. He personally organized the first such commission, in Kansas. He also sought to create more opportunity for African Americans at Kansas State, pushing for the racial integration of the Big Seven Conference (later Big Eight Conference) in 1949.

Eisenhower was often referred to as "Doctor." However, he did not hold an earned doctoral degree; instead, he had received an honorary doctorate of humane letters from the University of Nebraska in 1949. After leaving Kansas State University in 1950, Eisenhower served as president at two other universities: Pennsylvania State University from 1950 to 1956 and Johns Hopkins University from 1956 to 1967 and 1971 to 1972.

In July 1956, Milton Eisenhower assumed the presidency of Johns Hopkins University, succeeding Lowell J. Reed. During Eisenhower's first term, University income tripled and the endowment doubled. More than $76 million in new buildings were constructed, including the Milton S. Eisenhower Library, completed in 1964 and named for Eisenhower in 1965. Respected and admired by faculty and students alike, Eisenhower was arguably the most popular Hopkins president since Daniel Coit Gilman. He kept office hours when any student could drop in, and he was welcome at students' off-campus parties.

When Eisenhower retired in 1967, he was given the title president emeritus in recognition of his service. In March 1971, after Lincoln Gordon's abrupt resignation, the trustees asked Eisenhower to return until a permanent successor could be found. He reluctantly agreed to return, making it clear that the search for a permanent successor must begin immediately. His second administration, lasting ten months, required him to reduce a large deficit and slow the growth of the University's administration. His reputation for fairness helped greatly in that turbulent time, and, despite the budgetary problems, he was able to push forward with planning and design for a new student center. In January 1972, he was succeeded as president by Steven Muller, who (although hired by Lincoln Gordon) had served a ten-month "apprenticeship" under Eisenhower as vice president and provost. Eisenhower enjoyed a second active retirement until his death on May 2, 1985.

Political career
He served as a presidential adviser in the administrations of his brother Dwight D. Eisenhower (1953–1961), John F. Kennedy (1961–1963) and Lyndon B. Johnson (1963–1969). In 1968, he was appointed chairman of the National Commission on the Causes and Prevention of Violence by President Johnson.

Following the Bay of Pigs in 1961, President Kennedy asked Eisenhower, Eleanor Roosevelt, and labor leader Walter Reuther to negotiate the release of captured Americans with Cuban leader Fidel Castro.

In 1980, Eisenhower appeared on the ballot in Texas as the running mate of Congressman John B. Anderson, Independent candidate for President of the United States.

Personal life
On October 12, 1927, Eisenhower married Helen Elsie Eakin (1904–1954), with whom he had a son, Milton Stover Eisenhower, Jr., in 1930 and a daughter, Ruth Eakin Eisenhower, in 1938.

While attending college at Kansas State University, Eisenhower was a member of the fraternity Sigma Alpha Epsilon.

Eisenhower died of cancer in Baltimore, Maryland on May 2, 1985.

Legacy 
 The Milton S. Eisenhower Library of Johns Hopkins University, opened in 1964 and containing 2.5 million volumes, is named after him. It has the unusual feature of being almost entirely underground (because of the slope of the site where it was built). The south wall is entirely windows.
 The primary research facility at the Johns Hopkins University Applied Physics Laboratory was previously named the Milton S. Eisenhower Research Center (now the Research and Exploratory Development Department).
 The Milton S. Eisenhower Auditorium, a 2,595-seat center for the performing arts on the University Park campus of Penn State, opened in 1974. Eisenhower Chapel, on the same campus, is named for his wife, Helen Eakin Eisenhower.
 Eisenhower Hall, opened in 1951 on the Kansas State campus, is also named in his honor. It is home to the College of Arts and Sciences dean's office and the departments of History and Modern Languages. 
The Milton S. Eisenhower Symposium is an acclaimed, student-organized lecture series founded in 1967 at Johns Hopkins University. All events take place on the Homewood campus in Shriver Hall and are free and open to the public.

Further reading
 Ambrose, Stephen E., and Richard H. Immerman, Milton S. Eisenhower, Educational Statesman. (Baltimore: Johns Hopkins University Press, 1983) 331 pp. 
 Virginia M. Quiring, Milton S Eisenhower Years at Kansas State University (Friends of the Libraries of Kansas State Univ., 1986) 120 pages

References

External links 
 Papers of Milton S. Eisenhower, Dwight D. Eisenhower Presidential Library
 Dwight D. Eisenhower letter on Milton S. Eisenhower's resignation
 Memorandum, Milton. S. Eisenhower to Members of Congress, April 20, 1942; on War Relocation Authority
 Urban Legend regarding brother Dwight's induction as President of Columbia which was meant for Milton
 Japanese Relocation (Film) by U.S. Office of War Information, Publication date c. 1943
 

1899 births
1985 deaths
Eisenhower family
Dwight D. Eisenhower
Internment of Japanese Americans
Kansas State University alumni
Presidents of Pennsylvania State University
Presidents of Johns Hopkins University
Presidents of Kansas State University
UNESCO officials
People from Abilene, Kansas
Kansas Independents
American officials of the United Nations
People of the United States Office of War Information
Liberalism in the United States